Anna Bogomazova, known professionally as Anya Zova (born 7 April 1990), is a comedian, actress and professional athlete, born in the Soviet Union and raised by a Ukrainian mother and Russian father. She worked in the WWE competing in their developmental territory NXT Wrestling, under the ring name Anya. She is a founder of Acting School Miami Anya Zova and author of Zova's acting technique. Bogomazova graduated law school and won the Kickboxing World Cup in 2011. In 2020, Bogomazova made her debut on US television in the sitcom Brooklyn Nine Nine and TV series MacGyver. In April 2022, she toured the US with her own comedy show, "Make Laughs Not War," in support of Ukraine and uniting people.

Early life
Bogomazova was born on 7 April 1990 in Voronezh, Russia. At the age of 5 she took up calisthenics, which she studied for seven years. Her parents insisted that she should quit because of her height. From 2003 till 2004, Anna played tennis. At the age of 14 she took up kickboxing. Her styles consist of kickboxing and taekwondo. She eventually earned her black belt in taekwondo.

She graduated from the Voronezh Cooperative Institute and Voronezh State University with the qualifications of a lawyer and a translator in the field of professional communications.

Martial arts career

Kickboxing
Bogomazova began her career in competitive kickboxing in 2004 with Aleksei Dedov as her coach. She has placed second in the Kickboxing World Championship in 2006 and 2008. She has also placed first in the Kickboxing Russian Championship in 2008 and the Kickboxing World Cup in 2011. From 2006 through 2010 Anna was trained by legendary coach Fuad Farziev.

Since November 2010, she has been training in the USA.

Professional wrestling career

WWE (2012–2013)
In August 2012, Bogomazova signed a developmental contract with World Wrestling Entertainment and was assigned to its developmental territory NXT Wrestling (NXT).

In early 2013, she broke her arm during a training session which she claimed lead to being released from her developmental contract on May 17, 2013.
She plans on suing WWE for injury and extra for damages due to having two surgeries and now she has a scar on her hand. Bogomazova filed suit against Steve Keirn Inc. and World Wrestling Entertainment Inc. d/b/a Florida Championship Wrestling in Hillsborough County, Florida Circuit Court on March 8, 2017, claiming that the defendants did not properly train other amateur wrestlers, who ran into plaintiff while she warmed-up. On June 23, 2017, the lawsuit was voluntarily dismissed.

Television
Her first TV role was playing Anna Rubov in the sitcom Brooklyn Nine Nine (NBC Network) in their Season 7, Episode 6, which aired on March 5, 2020. The same year Anna played Krisitina on MacGyver (ABC Network) Season 4, Episode 5, which aired on March 6, 2020.

See also
List of female kickboxers

References

External links

1990 births
Living people
Middleweight kickboxers
Professional wrestling managers and valets
Russian female kickboxers
Russian female professional wrestlers
Russian female taekwondo practitioners
Voronezh State University alumni
Naturalized citizens of the United States